Dowla Pasan (also Romanized as Dowlā Pasān; also known as Dolāpesān, Doleh Pasān, and Dowleh Pasān) is a village in Dasht Rural District, Silvaneh District, Urmia County, West Azerbaijan Province, Iran. At the 2006 census, its population was 158, in 30 families.

References 

Populated places in Urmia County